Gorillini is a taxonomic tribe containing three genera: Gorilla and the extinct Chororapithecus and Nakalipithecus.

References

Extant Miocene first appearances
Mammal tribes
Homininae
Taxa described in 1968